This is a list of Ukrainian European Film Award winners and nominees. This list details the performances of Ukrainian actors, actresses, and films that have either been submitted or nominated for, or have won, a European Film Award.

Main categories

External links
 Nominees and winners at the European Film Academy website

See also
 List of Ukrainian submissions for the Academy Award for Best Foreign Language Film

European Film Academy Awards
European Film Award